Laury Betty Thilleman (born 30 July 1991) is a French journalist, model, TV Host, actress and beauty pageant titleholder who was crowned Miss France 2011 on 4 December 2010. She made the top 10 at Miss Universe 2011.

She graduated from ESC Bretagne Brest.

Miss France

Miss Universe
Thilleman was France's contestant in Miss Universe 2011 held in São Paulo (Brazil) and ranked in top 10 (6th runner up), her 2nd runner-up in Miss France pageant, Clémence Olesky (Miss Auvergne) represented France at the Miss World pageant, held in London. In a phone interview with the newspapers Première, she had been asked what she thought about the pageant winner (Leila Lopes, Miss Angola), she replied, "She was the only girl I didn't know very well. We didn't see her much; she was very discreet. She was often in jeans and not wearing makeup. We were all surprised by her win. Many girls made efforts that were not rewarded. I don't know, something is missing in her temperament. The fact that the competition was held in Brazil surely played a role." Because of this declaration, the Washington Post made an article considering her words as scandalous, "offering some nasty, sore loser, sour grapes, culturally imperious comments about Miss Angola".

Danse avec les stars

 Danse avec les stars

In 2013, she took part on the fourth season of French show Danse avec les stars (Dancing with the stars). She finished on seventh place with her dancing partner Maxime Dereymez. On October 26, 2013, they were eliminated finishing 7th out of 10 contestants.
She also attended the first Danse avec les stars tour.

References

External links

Official Laury Thilleman website

		

1991 births
Living people
Beauty pageant controversies
Miss Universe 2011 contestants
Miss France winners
Actors from Brest, France